The Score is a 2021 British musical heist film written and directed by Malachi Smyth. It stars Johnny Flynn, Will Poulter, Naomi Ackie and Lydia Wilson.

Cast
 Johnny Flynn as Mike
 Will Poulter as Troy
 Naomi Ackie as Gloria
 Lydia Wilson

Production
In February 2020, it was announced Johnny Flynn, Will Poulter, Naomi Ackie and Antonia Thomas had joined the cast of the film, with Malachi Smyth directing from a screenplay he wrote. Production was set to begin on 17 March 2020, but was delayed due to the COVID-19 pandemic. Production began on 31 August 2020, and concluded on 2 October 2020, with Lydia Wilson replacing Thomas. Filming took place in and around the Luton Hoo estate in Hertfordshire.

Release
The film had its premiere on 21 November 2021, at the Tallinn Black Nights Film Festival.

References

External links
 

2020s heist films
2021 films
2021 thriller films
British heist films
British thriller films
Film productions suspended due to the COVID-19 pandemic
Films shot in Hertfordshire
2020s English-language films
2020s British films
2020s musical films